Dimitrij Küttel (born 18 February 1994) is a Swiss handball player for Kadetten Schaffhausen and the Swiss national team.

He represented Switzerland at the 2020 European Men's Handball Championship. On 31. December 2020 he was diagnosed with Lymphoma. Since end of April 2021 he is in remission.

References

1994 births
Living people
Swiss male handball players
People from Aarau
Sportspeople from Aargau